Madame Arthur is a drag cabaret venue in the Rue des Martyrs, 18th arrondissement of Paris. It is named after the synonymous song.

History
Madame Arthur opened in 1946 as the first transvestite cabaret, which took its name from the famous song written in 1860 by  Paul de Kock and performed by  Yvette Guilbert.

Having been closed for many years, it was entirely restored and reopened in November 2015 by Divan du Monde, which has the neighbouring venue.

Coccinelle began her entertainment work at Madame Arthur. Marie-Pierre Pruvot (known as Bambi) also worked there.

References 

Cabarets in Paris
Drag (clothing)
Entertainment venues in Paris
LGBT culture in Paris
LGBT nightclubs